The following is a list of massacres and shooting incidents that have occurred in Thailand:

Before 2000

2000-2009

2010-2019

2020-present

References 

Massacres
Thailand

Massacres